Mass media in Togo includes radio, television, and online and print formats. The  news agency began in 1975. The Union des Journalistes Independants du Togo press association is headquartered in Lomé.

Newspapers and magazines
 Carrefour
 Le Combat du Peuple
 Le Crocodile
 Forum de la Semaine
 Liberté
 Motion d’Information
 Le Regard
 Togo-Presse

Radio
 Nana FM
 Radio Kara
 Radio Lome
 Radio Togolaise
 Zephyr FM

Television
 
 Telesports TV
 Télévision Togolaise
 TV2
 TV7
 New World TV

See also
 List of radio stations in Africa: Togo
 List of television stations in Africa: Togo
 Telecommunications in Togo
 Terrestrial fibre optic cable projects in Togo
 Canal Olympia a cinema company with movie theaters in Lome, Togo

References

This article incorporates information from the French Wikipedia.

Bibliography
 
  (Includes sections "Press," "Broadcasting and Communications," etc.)

External links
 
 DMOZ. Togo: News and Media

 
Togo
Togo